Temascaltepec Nahuatl ( Almomoloa Nahuatl) is an endangered variety of Nahuatl of western Mexico State spoken by 300 people. It is about 50% intelligible with its closest relatives.

References

Nahuatl
Languages of Mexico
Uto-Aztecan languages
Temascaltepec